() is a Dutch Naval rank, with a NATO rank of OF-7.

The  was responsible for ensuring that fleet continued to sail in the prescribed order at night.

Denmark-Norway
In 1771, the ranks was replaced with Counter admiral.

Netherlands

It is the second most junior admiral position of the Dutch Navy, ranking above commandeur ("commodore") and below a vice-admiraal ("vice admiral").

Russia
In the Imperial Russian Navy the rank of Schout-bij-nacht was kept until 1732, when the rank was replaced with counter admiral.

Sweden
Schoutbynacht was a rank used in the Swedish Navy from 1630 to 1771.  It was then replaced by the rank of Konteramiral.

See also
 Counter admiral

References

Dutch words and phrases
Military ranks of the Netherlands
Admirals
Military ranks of Russia